The economy of Malta is a highly industrialised, service-based economy. It is classified as an advanced economy by the International Monetary Fund and is considered a high-income country by the World Bank and an innovation-driven economy by the World Economic Forum. It is a member of the European Union and of the eurozone, having formally adopted the euro on 1 January 2008.

The strengths of Malta's economy are its advantageous location, being situated in the middle of the Mediterranean Sea at a crossroads between Europe, North Africa and the Middle East, its fully developed open market economy, multilingual population (88% of Maltese people speak English), productive labour force, low corporate tax and well developed finance and ICT clusters. The economy is dependent on foreign trade, manufacturing (especially electronics), tourism and financial services. In 2014, over 1.7 million tourists visited the island.

Malta's GDP per capita in 2022, adjusted by purchasing power parity, stood at $54,647 and ranked 15th in the list of EU countries in terms of purchasing power standard. In the 2013 calendar year, Malta recorded a budget deficit of 2.7%, which is within the limits for eurozone countries imposed by the Maastricht criteria, and Government gross debt of 69.8%. At 5.9%, Malta had the sixth-lowest unemployment rate in the EU in 2015.

Malta is the 18th-most democratic country in the world according to the Economist Intelligence Unit's Democracy Index.

History
During the Napoleonic Wars (1800–1815), Malta's economy prospered and became the focal point of a major trading system. In 1808, two-thirds of the cargo consigned from Malta went to Levant and Egypt. Later, one half of the cargo was usually destined for Trieste. Cargo consisted of largely British and colonial-manufactured goods. Malta's economy became prosperous from this trade and many artisans, such as weavers, found new jobs in the port industry.

In 1820, during the Battle of Navarino, which took place in Greece, the British fleet was based in Malta. In 1839, the Peninsular and Oriental Steam Navigation Company and East India Companies used Malta as a calling port on their Egypt and Levant runs.

In 1869, the opening of the Suez Canal benefited Malta's economy greatly as there was a massive increase in the shipping which entered in the port. The economy had entered a special phase. The Mediterranean Sea became the "world highway of trade" and a number of ships called at Malta for coal and various supplies on their way to the Indian Ocean and the Far East. From 1871 to 1881, about 8,000 workers found jobs in the Malta docks and a number of banks opened in Malta. By 1882, Malta reached the height of its prosperity.

However, the boom did not last long. By the end of the 19th century, the economy began declining and by the 1940s, Malta's economy was in serious crisis. This was primarily due to the invention of large ships which had become oil-fired and therefore had no need to stop in the Grand Harbor of Malta to refuel. The British Government had to extend the dockyard.

At the end of World War II, Malta's strategic importance had reached a low point. Modern air warfare technology and the invention of the atomic bomb had changed the importance of the military base. The British lost control of the Suez Canal and withdrew from the naval dockyard, transforming it for commercial shipbuilding and ship repair purposes.

Modern economy
The Maltese economy is dependent on foreign trade, manufacturing (especially electronics and pharmaceuticals), and tourism. Malta adopted the Euro currency on 1 January 2008.

Tourist arrivals and foreign exchange earnings derived from tourism have steadily increased since 1987. Following the September 11 attacks, the tourist industry suffered a temporary setback. With the help of a favorable international economic climate, the availability of domestic resources, and industrial policies that support foreign export-oriented investment, the economy has been able to sustain a period of rapid growth. Growing public and private sector demand for credit has led — in the context of interest rate controls — to credit rationing to the private sector and the introduction of non-interest charges by banks. Despite these pressures, consumer price inflation has remained low (2.2% according to the Central Bank of Malta in 2007), reflecting the impact of a fixed exchange rate policy (100% hard peg to the euro, in preparation for currency changeover) and lingering price controls.

There is a strong manufacturing base for high value-added products like electronics and pharmaceuticals, and the manufacturing sector has more than 250 foreign-owned, export-oriented enterprises. Tourism generates around 15% of GDP. Film production in Malta is another growing industry (approx. 35 million euros between 1997 and 2011), despite stiff competition from other film locations in Eastern Europe and North Africa, with the Malta Film Commission providing support services to foreign film companies for the production of feature cinema, commercials and television series.

From 2001 to 2005 the mean GDP real growth was 0.4% due to Malta losing pace in tourism and other industries. Unemployment was down to 4.4%, its lowest level in 3 years. Many formerly state-owned companies are being privatised—and the market liberalised.

Fiscal policy has been directed toward bringing down the budget deficit after public debt grew from a negative figure in 1988 to 56% in 1999 and 69.1% in 2009. By 2007, the deficit-to-GDP ratio was comfortably below 3% as required for eurozone membership, but due to pre-election spending has gone up to 4.4% in 2008 and 3.8% in 2009.

Energy 

Despite a great potential for solar and wind power, Malta produces almost all its electricity from oil, importing 100% of it. Energy and the cost of energy, which is oft-quoted as the highest in Europe, was a key issue in the 2013 election.

Industry

Banking

Statistics

Electricity - production:
1,620 GWh (1998)

Electricity - production by source:
fossil fuel:
98.6%
hydro:
0%
nuclear:
0%
Renewable sources:
1.4%
other:
0% (1998)

Electricity - consumption:
1,507 GWh (1998)

Electricity - exports:
0 kWh (1998)

Electricity - imports:
0 kWh (1998)

Agriculture - products:
potatoes, cauliflower, grapes, wheat, barley, tomatoes, citrus, cut flowers, green peppers; pork, milk, poultry, eggs

Currency:
1 euro = 100 cents since 1 January 2008
previously 1 Maltese lira = 100 cents;

Exchange rates:
Maltese liri (LM) per US$1 – 0.4086 (January 2000), 0.3994 (1999), 0.3885 (1998), 0.3857 (1997), 0.3604 (1996), 0.3529 (1995)
Irrevocably fixed conversion rate to the euro: Maltese liri (LM) per EUR1 - 0.4293 (2007)

Poverty
Poverty and social exclusion are significant problems in Malta. As of 2008, an estimate of15% of Malta's citizens were living below the poverty line, which was slightly better than the EU average of 17% at the time. To address the issue of poverty, on 24 December 2014 Malta addressed poverty in the six branches of social services, health and environment, culture, income and social benefits, education and employment, by unveiling the National Strategic Policy for Poverty Reduction and Social Inclusion; this will stay in effect from 2014 to 2024. Under this policy, stakeholders will be involved in the discussion of how to reduce hardships experienced by families living in Malta.

Unemployment system 
Benefits for unemployment are given out based on contributory and non-contributory schemes. Contributory schemes distribute unemployment benefits within 50 weeks of contribution. Non-contributory schemes a Social Unemployment Benefit is granted after a means test to the head of a household. In order to qualify for unemployment benefits, a person must be able to do work and have registered as unemployed.

There are three categories to the Malta registrar of unemployment. People who have never worked fall into category one. Those who quit or were dismissed from their jobs fall into category two. Category three is for people who are currently employed but are looking for other job prospects. Benefits for unemployment are given for 156 days after which a person may qualify for the means tested unemployment assistance. People eligible for unemployment benefits are Maltese citizens who are aged sixteen years or older, people signed up for eligible work-study programs, and citizens outside of Malta who are employed by foreign entities.

Some scholars have noted that Malta's unemployment system has created a dependency on the benefits provided by the system. From 1992 to 2005, there was an increase in the number of recipients of both short-term and long-term benefits. Additionally, in 2016, 969 Maltese citizens were cut off the employment register for abusing the system. For these reasons, there has been movements from politicians to reduce and reshape the unemployment system. After the election of the Labour Party in 2013, the number of people receiving unemployment benefits dropped by 75%. This same government introduced the "in-work" benefit which forces more people to work while helping the most poor and desperate.

In order to be eligible for in-work benefit, applicants must first have children under the age of 23, and from that point, benefits vary depending on marital status and the number of people employed per family. For a single parent in employment who earns between €6,600-€16,500, they are eligible for a maximum payable rate of up to €1,250 annually per child. For a married couple whose collective income is between €10,000 and is less than €24,000 (the income of one of the spouses must be over €3,000), they are eligible for a maximum payment rate of up to €1,200 annually per child. In 2016, the in-work benefit was extended to married couples where only one parent works, extending the benefit to an additional 3,700 families. For a married couple with only one parent gainfully employed whose income is greater than €6,600 and less than €16,500, they are eligible for a maximum payable rate of up to €350 yearly per child. The in-work benefit is paid quarterly in January, April, July, and October.

At 42.3% in 2017, female workforce participation rate in Malta is relatively low. For over half of Maltese women who stay out of the workforce altogether, they do not receive direct unemployment benefits. Rather, most unemployment benefits are given to men because to receive unemployment benefits, one must first be employed. However, because older women tend to stay out of the workforce, those women who do participate in the workforce tend to be younger and have higher levels of education. This has led to a lower long-term unemployment rate amongst women than men. In 2011, the long-term unemployment rate of women was 2.5% while the long-term unemployment rate of men was 3.3%.

Pensions system 
Malta has public and private pension systems. There are two types of contributions for the public pension system: class one and class two. Employed people contribute to class one and those are self-employed contribute to class two. There was a gradual increase in pension age in Malta in the 1950s and 1960s; for example, someone who was born in 1953 needs to be 62 years old in order to collect pensions while another person born in 1960 would have to be 64 years old in order to collect pensions. Another requirement to qualify for a Malta pension program is that a person must have been contributing to the program for a certain time period or they will not be eligible.

See also
Tourism in Malta
List of companies of Malta
Economy of Europe
General Retailers and Traders Union

References

Notes

 
Malta
Malta